Kavaneh, also rendered as Kavandeh, may refer to:

Hamadan Province
 Kavaneh, Hamadan (كوانه - Kavāneh)

Kurdistan Province
(كاوانه - Kāvāneh)
 Kavaneh-ye Hoseyn
 Kavaneh-ye Sharif